Dancing-lady orchid is a common name for several orchids and may refer to:

Oncidium
Tolumnia (plant)
Trichocentrum